The Charmco Building, or the home of Charleston Milling and Produce Company, was the site of its mill in Charleston. This mill replaced a prior one located on the same site that burnt down in 1913.

Charmco in Greenbriar County, West Virginia was named after the company. The company closed in 1956 and the building was leased out as warehouse space. The building, now vacant, was listed for sale in 2011 and remained on the market, until 2021, when it was listed as "under contract."

References

National Register of Historic Places in Kanawha County, West Virginia
Charleston, West Virginia